Jordanoleiopus feai is a species of beetle in the family Cerambycidae. It was described by Breuning in 1955.

References

Polymistoleiopus
Beetles described in 1955
Taxa named by Stephan von Breuning (entomologist)